James Wilfred McKinley Jr. (July 8, 1891 – August 3, 1957) served in the California State Senate and represented the 38th District.

Personal
McKinley Jr. was the son of James Wilfred McKinley who was the Los Angeles City Attorney, and Judge for the Superior Court for the Los Angeles County.

Military
During World War I he served in the United States Army.

References

United States Army personnel of World War I
1891 births
1957 deaths
Republican Party California state senators
20th-century American politicians